Aquebogue was a station stop along the Greenport Branch of the Long Island Rail Road in Aquebogue, New York.

History 
Aquebogue first appeared on the June 1892 timetable. Work began in March 1910 and was completed over the summer. An acre of land on the east was bought and filled in to provide a 1400-foot passing track. A new frame station was built in 1911 on the south side of the track opposite the new station. A new depot was erected at Aquebogue in 1910, and was gutted out and remodeled as a shelter shed in 1956, and was finally razed in July 1967.

References

External links
Main Line Stations (LIRRHistory.com)
Picture of Aquebogue station stop in 1936 from the Ron Ziel collection
Aquebogue LIRR station (TrainsAreFun)
A reference to Aquebogue in Gazetteer of the State of New York: Embracing a Comprehensive View of the ...
reference in Bulletin, Issues 55-57 By New York (State). Dept. of Agriculture and Markets
LIRR Aquebogue station July 2, 1967 4X6" print

Former Long Island Rail Road stations in Suffolk County, New York
Railway stations in the United States opened in 1892
Railway stations closed in 1967
1892 establishments in New York (state)
1967 disestablishments in New York (state)